Indian Falls may refer to:
 Indian Falls, California
 Indian Falls, New York